The Tvrdoš Monastery is a 15th-century Serbian Orthodox monastery near the city of Trebinje, Republika Srpska, Bosnia and Herzegovina. The 4th-century foundations of the first Roman church on the site are still visible.

The monastery, which is dedicated to the Dormition of the Most Holy Theotokos, was established during the 15th century, with a cathedral constructed around 1508 and painted with murals by Vicko Lavrov from Dubrovnik in 1517. The monastery remained a seat of the Metropolitans of Herzegovina until the Venetian Empire destroyed it in 1694. The current monastery building was constructed in 1924. Today, the monastery is renowned for its wine production (in particular from the local Vranac and Žilavka grape varieties) and its wine cellars, one of which dates to the 15th century, which are a popular tourist attraction.

As of late 2016, the monastery remains on the Provisional List for status as a National Monument of Bosnia and Herzegovina.

On 6 March 2021, the retired Bishop of Zahumlje and Herzegovina (1992–1999), Atanasije was buried in the Chapel of the Resurrection of the Lord in the cemetery of the monastery.

Gallery

See also
Eparchy of Zahumlje and Herzegovina

References

External links

Official page 

Buildings and structures in Republika Srpska
Religion in Republika Srpska
15th-century Serbian Orthodox church buildings
Rebuilt churches in Bosnia and Herzegovina
Serbian Orthodox monasteries in Bosnia and Herzegovina
Churches in Trebinje
History of the Serbs of Bosnia and Herzegovina
Wines of Bosnia and Herzegovina